The Ministry of Industry, Trade and MSMEs (Spanish: Ministerio de Industria, Comercio y Mipymes) of the Dominican Republic is a government institution in charge of formulating, evaluating and supervising the country's policies, plans and projects related to industries, exporting, internal trade, external trade, industrial zones and micro, small and medium-sized enterprises (MSMEs). It also manages the country's oil reserves and other fuels.

This office appeared with its current functions on 1966 as the Secretary of State of Industry and Trade (Secretaría de Estado de Industria y Comercio). Its headquarters are located at Santo Domingo. Its Minister is Víctor (Ito) Bisonó, since August 16, 2020.

History 
The origin of this Ministry is connected to the Ministry of Finance, found on the first Dominican Constitution, signed on November 6, 1844. This document specified that:A few days later, on November 14, 1844, the office was officially created as the Secretary of State of Finance and Trade (Secretaría de Estado de Hacienda y Comercio), being its first ministre-secretary Ricardo Miura.

It wouldn't be until 1934 that an office specifically dedicated to industry and trade was created by Law no. 786, that established the Secretary of State of Labor, Agriculture, Industry and Trade (Secretaría de Estado de Trabajo, Agricultura, Industria y Comercio). This institution had many changes over the years, being split into two offices during 1959 and 1966.

On June 30, 1966, this Ministry was reinstated by Law no. 290-66 that created the Secretary of State of Industry and Trade (Secretaría de Estado de Industria y Comercio). This office was in charge not only of industry and trade, but also mining and energy.

It adopted the name Ministry of Industry and Trade (Ministerio de Industria y Comercio), after the 2010 Constitutional reform and the subsequent Decree no. 56-10 which changed the names of all government agencies.

On 2013, it lost its attributions on the energy sector and mining with the creation of the Ministry of Energy and Mines with Law 100–13.

Later, on 2017, this Ministry adopted its current name, Ministry of Industry, Trade and MSMEs (Ministerio de Industria, Comercio y Mipymes), with the reorganization of the institution by Law 37–17. This gave more weight to micro, small and medium-sized enterprises (MSMEs or Mipymes in Spanish).

Internal structure 
As the other Ministries of the Dominican Republic, the Ministry of Industry, Trade and MSMEs is subdivided into vice-ministries. These are:

 Vice-ministries of External Trade
 Vice-ministries of Internal Trade
 Vice-ministries of Industrial Development
 Vice-ministries of Development of Micro, Small and Medium Enterprises
 Vice-ministries of Free Economic Zones and Special Regimes

Affiliated agencies 
Some of the offices affiliated to this Ministry are:

 Dominican Institute of Quality
 National Office of Industrial Property
 National Board for the Promotion and Support of Micro, Small and Medium Enterprises
 National Commission for Defense of Competition
 Center of Industrial Development and Competitivity
 Dominican Center of Exports and Investment
 National Board of Exporting Free Zones
 Regulatory Commission for Disloyal Practices
 National Office of Copyright
 Dominican Board of Quality

References

External links 

 Ministry of Industry, Trade and MSMEs – official website

Government of the Dominican Republic
Economy of the Dominican Republic